Aratorés is a small village located in the municipality of Castiello de Jaca in the Huesca province of Aragón, Spain. According to the 2012 census (INE), the village has a population of 40 inhabitants.

References 

Towns in Spain
Populated places in the Province of Huesca